Ilirska Bistrica railway station serves the nearby village of Ilirska Bistrica, Slovenia. It was opened in 1873, and is also a border station for trains to Rijeka, Croatia.

External links 
Official site of the Slovenian railways 

Railway stations in Slovenia
Railway stations opened in 1873